3,3-Dimethylhexane is a colourless, odourless liquid, chemical compound in the family of hydrocarbons which has a formula of C8H18. It is an isomer of octane.

References 

Hydrocarbons